Desert island jokes are jokes about a person or group of people stranded on a desert island.  This setting is typically used to play on stereotypes of the people present.  This may refer to their profession, religion or nationality, or the people involved may be famous figures.  The island setting highlights the absurdity of the stereotypical behaviour and prejudices of the protagonists, suggesting that they will find a way to express their own particular foibles even in a hostile setting. 

This setting is also popular in cartoons. Bob Mankoff, cartoon editor of The New Yorker attributes the strips, which began appearing in the publication in the 1930s, to the popularity of Robinson Crusoe. He describes earlier cartoons as having a large island with a ship sinking in the distance, and later cartoons merely showing one or two people on a tiny island with a single palm tree.

Example

References

Joke cycles